Irrigation scheduling is the process used by irrigation system managers to determine the correct frequency and duration of watering.  

The following factors may be taken into consideration:
 Precipitation rate of the irrigation equipment – how quickly the water is applied, often expressed in inches or mm per hour.
 Distribution uniformity of the irrigation system – how uniformly the water is applied, expressed as a percentage, the higher the number, the more uniform.
 Soil infiltration rate – how quickly the water is absorbed by the soil, the rate of which also decreases as the soil becomes wetter, also often expressed in inches or mm per hour.
 Slope (topography) of the land being irrigated as this affects how quickly runoff occurs, often expressed as a percentage, i.e. distance of fall divided by 100 units of horizontal distance (1 ft of fall per  would be 1%).
 Soil available water capacity, expressed in units of water per unit of soil, i.e. inches of water per foot of soil.
 Effective rooting depth of the plants to be watered, which affects how much water can be stored in the soil and made available to the plants.
 Current watering requirements of the plant (which may be estimated by calculating evapotranspiration, or ET), often expressed in inches per day.
 Amount of time in which water or labor may be available for irrigation.
 Amount of allowable moisture stress which may be placed on the plant. For high value vegetable crops, this may mean no allowable stress, while for a lawn some stress would be allowable, since the goal would not be to maximize production, but merely to keep the lawn green and healthy.  
 Timing to take advantage of projected rainfall
 Timing to take advantage of favorable utility rates
 Timing to avoid interfering with other activities such as sporting events, holidays, lawn maintenance, or crop harvesting.

The goal in irrigation scheduling is to apply enough water to fully wet the plant's root zone while minimizing overwatering and then allow the soil to dry out in between waterings, to allow air to enter the soil and encourage root development, but not so much that the plant is stressed beyond what is allowable.

In recent years, more sophisticated irrigation controllers have been developed that receive ET input from either a single on-site weather station or from a network of stations and automatically adjust the irrigation schedule accordingly. 

Other devices helpful in irrigation scheduling are rain sensors, which automatically shut off or may turn off manually an irrigation system when it rains, and soil moisture sensing devices such as capacitance sensors, tensiometers and gypsum blocks.

See also
Frequency domain sensor
Irrigation in viticulture
Neutron probe
Nonlimiting water range
Time domain reflectometer
BAITSSS

References
 Irrigation Association Smart Water Application Technology – site with generic information on smart controllers

Irrigation
Land management
Agricultural soil science